Béla Drahos (born 14 April 1955) is a Hungarian conductor and flautist.

Biography

Drahos started out as a flautist, joining the orchestra in his hometown when he was just 8 years old. At the age of 12 he became the principal flautist, and as a young man he won several flute competitions. He studied at the Liszt Academy in Budapest, graduating in 1978.

He did not make his conducting debut until 1992 with an all-Beethoven programme. His first recording as a conductor was a disc of three Haydn symphonies for Naxos Records. He has also been soloist and conductor in a disc of Vivaldi flute concerti, as well as conducting flute concerti by Leopold Hofmann with another soloist. Moreover, he worked with the Hungarian composer Robert Gulya and the Austrian guitarist Johanna Beisteiner and published recordings with them for Gramy Records. He was conductor during the recording of the critically acclaimed soundtrack of Hitman 2: Silent Assassin and Hitman: Blood Money, composed by Jesper Kyd and performed by the Budapest Symphony Orchestra and Hungarian Radio Choir.

Discography (incomplete)
 1992: Bach, C.P.E.: Sonatas for Flute and Harpsichord, Wq. 83-87 (Naxos)
 1998: Vivaldi: Flute Concertos Vol. 1 (Naxos)
 2000: Vivaldi: Flute Concertos Vol. 2 (Naxos)
 2002: Chill with Vivaldi (Naxos)
 2004: Between Present and past (Gramy Records)
 2005: Flute Moments (Naxos)
 2010: Live in Budapest (Gramy Records) Videos of Concerto for guitar and orchestra and the tango The Milonguero and the Muse by Robert Gulya played live by Béla Drahos, Johanna Beisteiner and the Budapest Symphony Orchestra.

References

External links
 Naxos bio

1955 births
Living people
Hungarian conductors (music)
Male conductors (music)
Hungarian flautists
People from Kaposvár
21st-century conductors (music)
21st-century Hungarian male musicians
21st-century flautists